

Medicine
 Vascular resistance

Physics
Electrical resistance, the measure of the degree to which a conductor opposes the flow of an electric current through that conductor
Friction
Drag (physics) ("air resistance"), fluid or gas forces opposing motion and flow
The inverse of Hydraulic conductivity, the ease with which water can flow through pore spaces or fractures in soil or rock
Thermal resistance, a measure of difficulty of heat flow through a substance
Thermal conductivity, how well heat flows through a substance
Thermal resistance in electronics, heat considerations in electronics design

Music 
Resistance to airflow through a wind instrument due to air friction (for instance, a tightly-coiled French horn has higher resistance than a straight unvalved slide trumpet)

Physics articles needing expert attention